Bettcher may refer to:

People 
 George Louis Bettcher (1862–1952), American architect based in Colorado
 James Bettcher (born 1978), American football coach
 Louis Bettcher (1914–1999), American inventor and manufacturer of handheld powered circular knives

Other 
 Bettcher Industries, developer and manufacturer of cutting tools used in food processing operations and industrial applications